The second season of the long-running Australian outback drama McLeod's Daughters began airing on 27 March 2002 and concluded on 16 October 2002 with a total of 22 episodes. Created by Posie Graeme-Evans and Caroline Stanton, the format is produced by Millenium Television and Nine Films and Television for the Nine Network distributed by Southern Star Group.

Cast

Regular
 Lisa Chappell as Claire McLeod
 Bridie Carter as Tess Silverman McLeod
 Jessica Napier as Becky Howard
 Rachael Carpani as Jodi Fountain
 Aaron Jeffery as Alex Ryan
 Myles Pollard as Nick Ryan
 Sonia Todd as Meg Fountain

Recurring
 John Jarratt as Terry Dodge
 Marshall Napier as Harry Ryan
 Catherine Wilkin as Liz Ryan
 Rodger Corser as Peter Johnson
 Fletcher Humphrys as Brick Buchanon (episodes 1-12)
 Charlie Clausen as Jake Harrison (episodes 13-22)

Guest
Richard Healy as Kevin Fountain
Carmel Johnson as Beth Martin
Ben Mortley as Alberto Borelli
 Luke Ford as Craig Woodland
 Inge Hornstra as Sandra Kinsella
 Doris Younane as Moira Doyle

Episodes

Reception

Ratings
On average, McLeod's Daughters received an audience of 1.41 million, and ranked at #10 for its second season.

Award nominations
The second season of McLeod's Daughters received six nominations at the 2003 Logie Awards.

 Gold Logie Award for Most Popular Personality on Australian Television – Nomination (Lisa Chappell)
 Logie Award for Most Popular Actress – Nomination (Bridie Carter)
 Logie Award for Most Popular Actress – Nomination (Lisa Chappell)
 Logie Award for Most Popular Actor – Nomination (Myles Pollard)
 Logie Award for Most Popular New Male Talent – Nomination (Ben Mortley)
 Logie Award for Most Popular Australian Program – Nomination

Home media

References

McLeod's Daughters seasons
2002 Australian television seasons